Ravindra Lakmal (full name Matharage Don Ravindra Lakmal; born 25 July 1981) was a Sri Lankan cricketer. He was a right-handed batsman and right-arm medium-pace bowler who played for Moratuwa Sports Club.

Lakmal made a single first-class appearance for the side, during the 2003–04 season, against Singha Sports Club. From the tailend, he scored 0 not out in both innings in which he batted.

He conceded 37 runs from 4 overs of bowling.

External links
Ravindra Lakmal at CricketArchive  

1981 births
Living people
Sri Lankan cricketers
Moratuwa Sports Club cricketers